Arthur Alfred Lynch (16 October 1861 – 25 March 1934) was an Irish Australian civil engineer, physician, journalist, author, soldier, anti-imperialist and polymath. He served as MP in the UK House of Commons as member of the Irish Parliamentary Party, representing Galway Borough from 1901 to 1902, and later West Clare from 1909 to 1918. Lynch fought on the Boer side during the Boer War in South Africa, for which he was sentenced to death but later pardoned. He supported the British war effort in the First World War, raising his own Irish battalion in Munster towards the end of the war.

Australian years
Lynch was born at Smythesdale near Ballarat, Victoria, the fourth of 14 children. His father, John Lynch, was an Irish Catholic surveyor and civil engineer and his mother Isabella (née MacGregor) was Scottish. John Lynch was a founder and first president of the Ballarat School of Mines, and a captain of Peter Lalor at the Eureka Stockade rebellion (1854) and John Lynch wrote a book, Austral Light (1893–94), about it – later republished as The Story of the Eureka Stockade.

Arthur Lynch was educated at Grenville College, Ballarat, (where he was "entranced" by differential calculus) and the University of Melbourne, where he took the degrees of BA in 1885 and MA in 1887. Lynch qualified as a civil engineer and practised this profession for a short period in Melbourne.

Europe and Ireland
Lynch left Australia and went to Berlin, where he studied physics, physiology and psychology at the University of Berlin in 1888–1889. He had a particular respect for Hermann von Helmholtz. Moving to London, Lynch took up journalism. In 1892, he contested Galway as a Parnellite candidate, but was defeated.

Lynch met Annie Powell (daughter of the Rev. John D. Powell) in Berlin and they were married in 1895. They were to have no children. In Lynch's words, the marriage "never lost its happiness" (My Life Story, p. 85).

In 1898, he was Paris correspondent for the London Daily Mail.

Boer brigade
When the Second Boer War broke out, Lynch was sympathetic to the Boers and decided to go to South Africa as a war correspondent. In Pretoria, he met General Louis Botha, and decided to join the Boer side. Lynch raised the Second Irish Brigade, which consisted of Irishmen, Cape colonists and others opposed to the British. He was given the rank of Colonel and saw limited active service. In his comprehensive history on the Australia's Boer War, Wilcox said, it was misleading to call the 70 or so men in the Irish unit raised by Lynch "a brigade", rather he suggested that "the publicity that comes from spectacular gestures..." made Lynch appear "a romantic warrior" and that his actions "flattered many Irishmen and women...". In contrast, O'Brien's fictional Bye-Bye Dolly Gray, is kinder to Lynch's showy South African exploits and his uitlanders. Michael Davitt who travelled to South Africa has photos of Lynch with his brigade on the veldt in The Boer Fight for Freedom.

Conviction and pardon

From South Africa, Lynch went to the United States, and then returned to Paris, from where he again stood for Galway Borough in November 1901 and was elected in his absence as MP. On going to London, Lynch was arrested for his pro-Boer activities and on remand for eight months. Lynch was tried for treason before three judges, and on 23 January 1903 was found guilty and sentenced to be hanged. This sentence was immediately commuted to a life sentence, and a year later Lynch was released "on licence" by the Balfour government.

In July 1907, Lynch was pardoned, and in 1909 he was again elected Member of Parliament, this time for West Clare, in Ireland.

Munster battalion
During World War I, Lynch volunteered for the New British Army. He raised a private 10th Battalion, Royal Munster Fusiliers and was given the rank of colonel, although he and his unit never saw active front service.

At the end of the war, Lynch chose to stand as a Labour candidate in newly created Battersea South for the 1918 General election. He finished second to the Conservative candidate. 

He had qualified as a physician many years earlier, and began to practise medicine in London, at Haverstock Hill. He died in London on 25 March 1934.

Publications
Lynch wrote and published a large number of books ranging from poetry to a sophisticated attempt to refute Albert Einstein's theory of relativity. His verse was clever and satirically Byronic, and his essays and studies show much reading and acuteness of mind. E. Morris Miller, himself a professor of philosophy, mentions Lynch's "high reputation as a critical and philosophical writer especially for his contributions to psychology and ethics" (Australian Literature, p. 273). His publications include:

Modern Authors (1891)
Approaches the Poor Scholar's Quest of a Mecca (1892)
A Koran of Love (1894)
Our Poets (1894)
Religio Athletae (1895)
Human Documents (1896)
Prince Azreel (1911)
Psychology; A New System (two vol.; 1912)
Purpose and Evolution (1913)
Sonnets of the Banner and the Star (1914)
Ireland: Vital Hour (1915)
Poppy Meadows, Roman Philosophique (1915)
La Nouvelle Ethique (1917)
L'Evolution dons ses Rapports avec l'ethique (1917)
Moments of Genius (1919)
The Immortal Caravel (1920)
Moods of Life (1921)
O'Rourke the Great (1921)
Ethics, an Exposition of Principles (1922)
Principles of Psychology (1923)
Seraph Wings (1923)
My Life Story (1924)
Science, Leading and Misleading (1927)
The Rosy Fingers (1929)
The Case Against Einstein (1932)

Notes

References

John Lynch, The Story of the Eureka Stockade: Epic Days of the Early Fifties at Ballarat, (1895). Republished 1947(?) and later by Ballarat Heritage Services, Ballarat, 1999.

Popular culture
Antony O'Brien, Bye-Bye Dolly Gray, Artillery Publishing, Hartwell, 2006. (a novel includes several sympathetic scenes involving Lynch's exploits on the Colenso, Johannesburg and Transvaal front during 1899 and 1900)

At the Boer War
Craig Wilcox. (2002), Australia's Boer War: The War in South Africa, 1899-1902, Oxford. A blunt appraisal of A.A's action in the war
Michael Davitt. (1902) The Boer Fight For Freedom: From the Beginning of Hostilities to the Peace of Pretoria, Funk & Wagnalls, New York, 3rd ed.

External links

1861 births
1934 deaths
University of Melbourne alumni
Australian non-fiction writers
Australian poets
Royal Munster Fusiliers officers
Irish Parliamentary Party MPs
UK MPs 1900–1906
UK MPs 1906–1910
UK MPs 1910
UK MPs 1910–1918
Australian prisoners sentenced to death
Prisoners sentenced to death by England and Wales
People convicted of treason against the United Kingdom
Boer military personnel of the Second Boer War
Australian civil engineers
Recipients of British royal pardons
Relativity critics
People from Smythesdale, Victoria
Members of the Parliament of the United Kingdom for County Galway constituencies (1801–1922)
Members of the Parliament of the United Kingdom for County Clare constituencies (1801–1922)
Labour Party (UK) parliamentary candidates